Jay Robert Nash (born November 26, 1937, in Indianapolis, Indiana) is an American author of more than 70 books on myriad aspects of true crime.

Among Nash's crime anthologies are Encyclopedia of Western Lawmen and Outlaws, Look For the Woman, Bloodletters and Badmen, and The Great Pictorial History of World Crime. He has also compiled his exhaustive research of criminal behaviour into a CD-ROM entitled Jay Robert Nash's True Crime Database.

Biography
Jay Robert Nash currently lives in Wilmette, Illinois and describes himself as an "entrepreneurial businessman". 
Nash has won Best Reference citations from the American Library Association for four of his books, including Darkest Hours. However, he has said that his books are "seeded with information to detect any unauthorized use or duplication"; the precise nature of these copyright traps may include incorrect information in otherwise factual entries, or wholly fictitious entries. Sally G. Waters, writing for the Library Journal, called Nash's work "fascinating yet flawed" and recommended that it be used only for background research, verifying the information based on the sources in Nash's bibliography.
In the Journal of American History, Richard Maxwell Brown also noted the "numerous errors, omissions, inconsistencies, and anomalies" in Nash's encyclopedias. In 2008, The Library of America selected Nash's story "The Turner-Stompanato Affair" for inclusion in its two-century retrospective of American True Crime.

CBS lawsuit
Nash once filed a lawsuit against CBS for producing an episode of Simon & Simon with a plotline based around his notion that bank robber John Dillinger was not killed by the FBI in 1934 (Nash focused two separate books on his theory). His claim of copyright infringement was dismissed on summary judgment, a ruling upheld by an appeals court. The court compared Nash's writing to "speculative works representing themselves as fact" and concluded that he could not claim a copyright on his analysis of historical facts, only his expression of them. The court added that Nash should not be surprised at the result, pointing out, "His own books are largely fresh expositions of facts looked up in other people's books."

Selected bibliography
 Hustlers and Con Men: An Anecdotal History of the Confidence Man and His Games published by M. Evans & Company (1976)
 Darkest Hours: A Narrative Encyclopedia of Worldwide Disasters from Ancient Times to the Present published by Pocket Books (1977).
 Among the Missing: An Anecdoctal History of Missing Persons from 1800 to the Present (1978), Rowman and Littlefield.
 Ballistics
 Look for the Woman: A Narrative Encyclopedia of Female Poisoners, Kidnappers, Thieves, Extortionists, Terrorists, Swindlers and Spies from Elizabethan Times to the Present published by M. Evans & Company (1986).
 The Mafia Diaries published by Dell Publishing Company (1986)
 The Motion Picture Guide published by Cinebooks during the 1970s and early '80s. This was a twelve volume reference work.
 The Motion Picture Guide published by Cinebooks beginning in 1985, this is an annual book.
 Murder Among the Rich & Famous published by Random House (1988)
 People to See
 The Dark Fountain published by Signet (1988).
 World Encyclopedia of 20th Century Murder published by Paragon House Publishers (1992)
 World Encyclopedia of Organized Crime  published by Paragon House Publishers (April 1992) 
 Dictionary of Crime: Criminal Injustice, Criminology, & Law Enforcement published by Marlowe & Company (1994).
 The Dillinger Dossier
 Bloodletters and Bad Men: Lucky Luciano to Charles Manson; A Who's Who of Vile Men (and Women) Wanted For Every Crime in the Book published by M. Evans and Company, Inc., revised and updated edition (1995).
 Citizen Hoover
 Concise Encyclopedia of the Civil War
 Crime Movie Quiz Book
 Crime Scene Investigations
 Cyber Crime
 Spies: A Narrative Encyclopedia of Dirty Tricks and Double Dealing from Biblical Times to Today published by M. Evans and Company, Inc. (1997)
 Terrorism In The 20th Century: A Narrative Encyclopedia from the Anarchists, Through the Weathermen, to the Unabomber
 The Great Pictorial History of World Crime published by Scarecrow Press (2004)
 Encyclopedia Of Civil War Battles published by Scarecrow Press (2005).
 Encyclopedia of Western Lawmen & Outlaws
 Fingerprint Identification And Classification
 Forensic Anthropology
 Forensic DNA Analysis
 Forensic Psychology
 Forensic Serology
 Forensic Toxicology
 Forensic Pathology

References

1937 births
Living people
American non-fiction crime writers
Edgar Award winners
Non-fiction writers about organized crime in the United States
People associated with true crime
Writers from Indianapolis